Brand activism is one way business can play a role in processes of social, political, economic, or environmental change. Applying brand activism, businesses show concern not for profits but for the communities they serve, and their economic, social, and environmental problems, which allows businesses to establish value-based relationships with customers and prospects. Businesses express brand activism through the vision, values, goals, communication, and behavior of the businesses and its brands towards the communities they are part of. Unlike corporate social responsibility and environmental, social and corporate governance politics, which are marketing-driven and corporate-driven, brand activism is society-driven.

In their book titled Brand Activism: From Purpose to Action, Philip Kotler and Christian Sarkar define brand activism as follows: "Brand Activism consists of business efforts to promote, impede, or direct social, political, economic, and/or environmental reform or stasis with the desire to promote or impede improvements in society; it is driven by a fundamental concern for the biggest and most urgent problems facing society."

Thus, brand activism can be regressive or progressive; for example companies that lobby our politicians for regressive policies are brand activists, as are companies seeking to have an impact on the biggest societal problems.

Current problems facing society typically drive companies towards brand activism. Once a brand sides with a cause, it must not only support the cause publicly but also it must actively contribute to the cause's initiatives. Brand activism shifts a company's vision from solely an internal impact to an external impact emphasizing advocacy and justice.

History 
The first company ever recorded to share its beliefs with the public was The Body Shop, a cosmetics company founded in Brighton, England. Founder Dame Anita Roddick wanted to build a brand that was animal cruelty free, environmentally friendly, and inclusive of every body type. In 1986, The Body Shop took their beliefs a few steps further when Roddick joined forces with the Save the Whales campaign to put an end to whaling for profit. Since then, several other companies have broadcast their beliefs in the name of brand activism.

Into the 21st Century 
At the turn of the 21st century, millennials and Gen Z inspired more business to support societal causes. Both generations are heavily involved in the digital world, and make social issues public in any part of the world with a connection to the Internet. Brands can show their support for social issues via social media. Not only can companies use Instagram, Twitter, Facebook, or other platforms to stand in solidarity, but can also use their influence to educate consumers about why a social issue is relevant and important.

Brand activism affects company consumption as well. Consumers support brands that support similar causes to their own. Social media brand activism can come in a variety of forms such as ad campaigns, celebrity endorsements, non-profits partnerships, or public donations.

Black Lives Matter 
In 2013, #BlackLivesMatter was established. This gave rise to hashtag activism as a way for companies to show public support and it allowed for brand's personality to shine through for consumers. Several brands, such as Ben & Jerry's and Glossier, shared the hashtag on their social media accounts as a way to declare solidarity against police brutality. In 2018 Nike advertised the celebrity endorsement of former NFL quarterback Colin Kaepernick, a strong supporter of BLM. Consumers had mixed reactions to their campaign-ad slogan "Believe in something. Even if it means sacrificing everything." Some supported Kaepernick while others burned their Nike merchandise in retaliation.

COVID-19 pandemic 
During the coronavirus pandemic, social media usage was at an all-time high. People used social media to stay connected while face-to-face public interaction was more restricted. This heightened consumer consciousness, which in turn forced businesses to respond to social issues. Brands had to analyze their company values and determine whether they should support certain causes such as environmental ethics, immigration reform, politics, or public health. Many brands used their platform to encourage the public to wear masks and social distance to drive down COVID-19 cases.

See also 

 Consumer activism
 Economic activism

References 

Activism
Activism by type